The 2022–23 Moldovan Women's Cup is the 26th season of the Moldovan annual football tournament. The competition started on 9 November 2022 and will conclude with the final on 20 May 2023. A total of seven teams had their entries to the tournament.

Quarter-finals 
Nistru Cioburciu received a bye for the quarter-finals.

|}

Matches

Semi-finals
The first legs were played on 15 March 2023 and the second legs will be played on 12 April 2023.

|}

Matches

References

Moldovan Women's Cup seasons
Moldovan Women's Cup 2022-23
Moldova